The terms toroidal and poloidal refer to directions relative to a torus of reference. They describe a three-dimensional coordinate system in which the poloidal direction follows a small circular ring around the surface, while the toroidal direction follows a large circular ring around the torus, encircling the central void.

The earliest use of these terms cited by the Oxford English Dictionary is by Walter M. Elsasser (1946) in the context of the generation of the Earth's magnetic field by currents in the core, with "toroidal" being parallel to lines of latitude and "poloidal" being in the direction of the magnetic field (i.e. towards the poles).

The OED also records the later usage of these terms in the context of toroidally confined plasmas, as encountered in magnetic confinement fusion.

Example
Then the Toroidal/Poloidal coordinate system relates to standard Cartesian Coordinates by these transformation rules:

where .

The natural choice geometrically is to take , giving the toroidal and poloidal directions shown by the arrows in the figure above, but this makes  a left-handed curvilinear coordinate system. As it is usually assumed in setting up flux coordinates for describing magnetically confined plasmas that the set  forms a right-handed coordinate system, we must either reverse the poloidal direction by taking , or reverse the toroidal direction by taking . Both choices are used in the literature.

Kinematics

To study single particle motion in toroidally confined plasma devices, velocity and acceleration vectors must be known. Considering the natural choice , the unit vectors of toroidal and poloidal coordinates system  can be expressed as:

 

according to Cartesian coordinates. The position vector is expressed as:

 

The velocity vector is then given by:

 

and the acceleration vector is:

See also

 Toroidal coordinates
 Torus
 Zonal and poloidal
 Poloidal–toroidal decomposition
 Zonal flow (plasma)

References

Coordinate systems